West Hills College Lemoore is a public community college in Lemoore, California. It was built in 2002 and serves students in the San Joaquin Valley. In addition, classes are offered at Lemoore Naval Air Station. West Hills College Lemoore is part of West Hills Community College District. Classes from California State University, Fresno are video conferenced in the campus and Fresno Pacific University offers two bachelor's degree programs on the campus.

West Hills College Lemoore offers soccer, golf and cross country for both men and women, basketball for women, and wrestling for men. It is accredited by the Accrediting Commission for Community and Junior Colleges.

External links
 Official website

California Community Colleges
Universities and colleges in Kings County, California
Lemoore, California
Schools accredited by the Western Association of Schools and Colleges
Two-year colleges in the United States